Quetta Division is an administrative division of Balochistan Province, Pakistan, being the third tier of government.

In 2015, the Balochistan Assembly unanimously passed a resolution calling upon the provincial government to establish a new Rakhshan Division comprising the districts of Nushki, Chagai, Kharan and Washuk which were parts of Quetta and Kalat.

History 
In 14 October 1955, Quetta create a Admistration division of Balochistan Province .

Districts 
It contains the following districts:

 Killa Abdullah District
 Karezat District
 Pishin District
 Quetta District
 Chaman District

Demographics 
According to 2017 census, Quetta division had a population of 4,170,194, which includes 2,181,934 males and 1,987,906 females. 
Quetta division constitutes 8,585  Hindus, 4,132,257 Muslims, 26,375 Christians followed by 1,420 Ahmadi and 1557 others.

References

Divisions of Balochistan